Ken Wheat (born 1950) and Jim Wheat (born 1952) are an American screenwriting, producing, and directing duo. Mainly known for their horror films, the brothers co-wrote the slasher film The Silent Scream (1979), as well as A Nightmare on Elm Street 4: The Dream Master (1988) and The Fly II (1989). In 1989, they wrote, directed, and produced the anthology horror film After Midnight. They later devised the story and co-wrote the screenplay of the science fiction horror film Pitch Black (2000).

Filmography

Also credited as "Characters created" in The Chronicles of Riddick  franchise (second and third films, shorts and video games).

References

External links
 

American male screenwriters
American film directors
American film producers
1950 births
Living people